The Norwegian Physical Society is a professional society in Norway for physicists. Formed in 1953, its purpose is to promote research, public understanding and cooperation within physics. Its magazine, running since 1956, is Fra Fysikkens Verden.

Chair is Asle Sudbø. The society consists of six scientific sub-groups as well as the Norwegian Physics Teachers' Association, which have one member of the board each.

References

Physics societies
Education in Norway
Scientific organizations established in 1953
1953 establishments in Norway
Scientific organisations based in Norway